Saraiu is a commune in Constanța County, Northern Dobruja, Romania.

The commune includes three villages:
 Saraiu
 Dulgheru
 Stejaru (historical name: Carapelit)

Demographics
At the 2011 census, Saraiu had 1,231 Romanians (99.84%), 2 others (0.16%).

References

Communes in Constanța County
Localities in Northern Dobruja
Place names of Turkish origin in Romania